Joyce Yakubowich (née Sadowick; born 29 May 1953) is a Canadian former track and field sprinter who competed mainly in the 200 metres and 400 metres. She was the 400 m gold medallist at the 1975 Pan American Games, where she also won relay medals. She twice represented Canada at the Summer Olympics (1972, 1976) and was a three-time Canadian national sprint champion.

Career
Born in Burnaby, British Columbia, she made her international debut at age seventeen at the 1970 British Commonwealth Games. She was eliminated in the heats of the 400 m, but managed to secure a bronze medal with the Canadian women's 4 × 100 m relay team, which included Joan Hendry, Patty Loverock and Stephanie Berto. She went on to attend the University of Victoria and broke several track records, including one for the 300 metres which remains unbeaten.

Yakubowich ran at the 1971 Pan American Games and made her first individual final, taking sixth in the 400 m. With the Canadian relay team she missed a medal, taking fourth some distance behind bronze medallists Jamaica. Her first national titles came at the 1972 Canadian Track and Field Championships, where she claimed both the 200 m and 400 m races – the latter in a championship record of 54.1 seconds. An Olympic debut came the following year at the 1972 Munich Games, but the 19-year-old failed to make it out of the heats. She gained her first individual medal a year later at the 1973 Pacific Conference Games, taking 400 m bronze.

The 1975 season proved to be the peak of her career. First, she won the third and final national title of her career in the 200 m. She was chosen to compete in four events at the 1975 Pan American Games. She placed sixth in the 200 m final, recording a lifetime best time of 23.34 seconds. She gave a dominant performance in the women's 400 m final, defeating American Debra Sapenter by over half a second to win the gold medal in 51.62 seconds – another lifetime personal record and also a games record. Another games record and gold medal came with the 4 × 400 m relay team of Margaret McGowen, Rachelle Campbell, and Joanne McTaggart, which she led off to victory to 3:30.36 minutes. A third medal of the games for Yakubowich came in the 4 × 100 metres relay: running the anchor leg off McTaggart and 100 m minor medallists Patty Loverock and Marjorie Bailey the team took the bronze.

She made two further high-profile international appearances in her career following her Pan American success. She returned to the Olympic stage at the 1976 Montreal Olympics, running in the 400 m quarter-finals and placing eighth in the relay final on home turf alongside fellow Canadians Margaret Stride, Campbell and Yvonne Saunders. Her last outing was for the Americas team at the 1977 IAAF World Cup: running with Cuba's Aurelia Pentón and Jamaicans Jacqueline Pusey and Helen Blake, she placed fifth.

International competitions

National titles
Canadian Track and Field Championships
200 m: 1972, 1975
400 m: 1972

References

External links
Canadian Olympic Committee profile

Living people
1953 births
Canadian female sprinters
Sportspeople from Burnaby
Olympic track and field athletes of Canada
Athletes (track and field) at the 1972 Summer Olympics
Athletes (track and field) at the 1976 Summer Olympics
Pan American Games gold medalists for Canada
Pan American Games bronze medalists for Canada
Pan American Games medalists in athletics (track and field)
Athletes (track and field) at the 1971 Pan American Games
Athletes (track and field) at the 1975 Pan American Games
Commonwealth Games bronze medallists for Canada
Commonwealth Games medallists in athletics
Athletes (track and field) at the 1970 British Commonwealth Games
Victoria Vikes athletes
Medalists at the 1975 Pan American Games
Olympic female sprinters
Medallists at the 1970 British Commonwealth Games